"Chitai" is also a common name for the river loach Schistura montana.

Chitai or Jethai is a village on the Almora-Pithoragarh highway,  from Almora in Uttarakhand state, India. It is known for the temple of Golu Devata.

Culture of Uttarakhand
Tourism in Uttarakhand
Almora
Villages in Almora district